Mayer Joel Mandelbaum (born October 12, 1932) is an American music composer and teacher, best known for his use of microtonal tuning (notably just intonation and 19 equal temperament and the 31 equal temperament). He wrote the first Ph.D. dissertation on microtonality in 1961. He is married to stained glass artist Ellen Mandelbaum, and is the nephew of Abraham Edel.

Career
Born in New York City, Mandelbaum received his Ph.D. from Indiana University in music theory in 1961. He also studied at the Harvard and Brandeis universities, as well as the Berkshire Music Center and the Berlin Hochschule für Musik. His composition teachers included Boris Blacher, Luigi Dallapiccola, Irving Fine, Walter Piston, and Harold Shapero. His thesis was focused on the 19 equal temperament. He was a teacher and chairman of the music department at Queens College, City University of New York, from 1961 to 1999.

Mandelbaum became interested in microtonality after listening to a lecture by Paul Hindemith in which Hindemith inadequately debunked various alternative forms of tuning. He began a correspondence with Adriaan Fokker which led to a six-week stay in Haarlem, Netherlands, in 1963, during which he composed music using Euler's genera under Fokker's tutelage. The result was 10 Studies in 31-Tone Temperament, which premiered on the Fokker organ in Haarlem.

Mandelbaum's motivation to use the 31 equal temperament arose from its close approximation to just intonation; Mandelbaum preferred the equal temperament to just tuning out of convenience, as it produced one tuning of a keyboard with which it was possible to explore approximations of chords to just tuning in any key. Although well known for exploring alternate tunings, Mandelbaum still uses conventional tuning in about 80% of his music. Mandelbaum attributes his use of conventional tuning to his reluctance to use keyed instruments (such as woodwinds) in tunings other than those that they were designed for.

Mandelbaum's music has been recorded on Capstone and Ravello Records (Parma Recordings).

References

External links
 Page about Mandelbaum on the Huygens-Fokker Foundation's website
 , posted by Leonard Lehrman and Helene Williams

1932 births
Living people
Composers from New York City
Indiana University alumni
Harvard University alumni
Brandeis University alumni
Tanglewood Music Center alumni
Berlin University of the Arts alumni
Queens College, City University of New York faculty
Microtonal composers
American opera composers
Male opera composers
American classical composers
American male classical composers
20th-century classical composers
20th-century American composers
20th-century American male musicians
21st-century classical composers
21st-century American composers
21st-century American male musicians